WYOR may refer to:

 WYOR (FM), a radio station (88.5 FM) licensed to serve Republic, Ohio, United States
 WGFJ, a radio station (94.1 FM) licensed to serve Cross Hill, South Carolina, United States, which held the call sign WYOR from 2007 to 2010